The 2013–14 season of Romania's top level women's football league was the first under the new name Superliga. The old name Liga I is now being used for the new second-level league. It is the 24th season of top-level football and will decide the Romanian champions and UEFA Women's Champions League participant.

Olimpia Cluj were the defending champions and defended their title with a fourth championship title in a row.

Alexandra Lunca won the top scorer award with 31 goals.

Changes from 2012 to 2013
 Eight instead of 18 teams play in the league. All teams play in a single division.
 The league is again divided into a first stage and then a championship and relegation round.
 For the first time club's face relegation, as the bottom two placed clubs are relegated into next season's Liga I.

Standings

Regular season
Each team plays 14 games.

Championship Group
Played by the top four teams of the first round. Teams play each other twice. Bonus points awarded for the regular season finish: Cluj 3, Craiova 2, Timișoara 1 and Targu Mures 0.

Relegation Group
Played by the teams placed fifth to eighth of the first stage. Teams play each other twice. Bonus points awarded for regular season finish: Fair Play 3, Brazi 2, Iasi 1, Independenţa Baia Mare 0.

References

External links
 Official site
 Season on soccerway.com

Rom
Fem
Romanian Superliga (women's football) seasons